Montel Kofi Owusu Agyemang (born 22 November 1996) is an English professional footballer midfielder who plays for Isthmian Premier Division side Billericay Town.

Career
Agyemang was first named on Orient's first-team bench for the 2–0 win at Doncaster Rovers on 21 October 2014, and made his senior debut as a late substitute for Romain Vincelot in the 3–0 win at Yeovil Town on 29 December.

In February 2015, Agyemang went on a work experience loan to Southern League club Royston Town. He made his debut in Royston's 2–0 win at Aylesbury United on 21 February.

On 1 October 2015, Agyemang went to Isthmian League Premier Division club Grays Athletic on another work experience loan.

After a spell at Maldon & Tiptree during which he made 37 appearances in all competitions, scoring three goals, he joined East Thurrock United prior to the 2016–17 season.

On 18 May 2018, Agyemang signed for Wealdstone. He then went on to sign for Welling United in November 2018.

In June 2021, Agyemang joined Isthmian League Premier Division side Margate.

In June 2022, Agyemang joined Billericay Town following their relegation from National League South.

References

External links

1996 births
Living people
English footballers
Association football midfielders
Footballers from the London Borough of Southwark
Leyton Orient F.C. players
Royston Town F.C. players
Grays Athletic F.C. players
Fisher F.C. players
Maldon & Tiptree F.C. players
East Thurrock United F.C. players
Wealdstone F.C. players
Welling United F.C. players
Margate F.C. players
Billericay Town F.C. players
English Football League players
Southern Football League players
Isthmian League players
National League (English football) players
Black British sportsmen